Tunisia (TUN) hold the 1967 Mediterranean Games in capital Tunis.

Nations at the 1967 Mediterranean Games
1967
Mediterranean Games